Alauddin Firuz Shah I was the son and successor of Sultan Shihabuddin Bayazid Shah of Bengal. He was a sultan only in name; the effective powers being wielded by Raja Ganesha, the landlord of Dinajpur. Ganesha dethroned him after he had ruled only for a few months. Coins of Alauddin Firuz Shah I, issued in 817 Hijrih from Muazzamabad (East Bengal) and Satgaon (South Bengal), have been found. But no coins issued from the capital Firuzabad (Pandua) have so far been found. After Ganesha usurped the throne of Bengal Firuz Shah might have fled from the capital and tried to establish his authority over southern and eastern Bengal. But soon Ganesha defeated and killed Firuz Shah.

See also
List of rulers of Bengal
History of Bengal
History of Bangladesh
History of India

Ilyas Shahi dynasty
15th-century Indian Muslims